Khadija Mushtaq is a Pakistani academic administrator and educator. She is the chancellor of Roots Ivy International University and chief executive officer of the Roots School System.

Education
Mushtaq completed a Master of Economics degree with a specialization in development studies and monetary policy from Quaid-i-Azam University.

Career 
Mushtag began her career as a teacher. She is an advocate for starting education at an early age. Mushtaq is the chief executive officer of Roots School System (RSS). Mushtaq founded and leads of the University of London International Programme at RSS. She is principal of the largest RSS campus, in Defence Housing Authority, Islamabad.

Mushtaq is the chancellor of Roots Ivy International University.

Mushtaq is an activist and patron to several non-governmental organizations including the 'Liberating the Girl Child Foundation'.

Personal life 
Khadija has two kids.One of them studies at Roots Ivy International.

Awards and honours
Mushtaq received the Yale Educator Award in 2009 and the Best Councillor Award from Massachusetts Institute of Technology (MIT) in 2010.
In 2011, Mushtaq was awarded the Tamgha-e-Imtiaz (Medal of Distinction) Award in the field of education by the President of Pakistan.
Mushtaq received the Claus Nobel Educator of Distinction award from the National Society of High School Scholars, and the Counsellor's Award from Richmond University and New York University. 
Mushtaq received an honorary doctorate degree from BPP University (UK), and has received awards for her work in education.

See also
 List of women presidents or chancellors of co-ed colleges and universities

References

Year of birth missing (living people)
Pakistani women in business
Pakistani schoolteachers
Quaid-i-Azam University alumni
Recipients of Tamgha-e-Imtiaz
Women heads of universities and colleges
Pakistani academic administrators
Women school principals and headteachers
Pakistani business executives
Women business executives
21st-century businesswomen
Pakistani school principals and headteachers
21st-century educators
Place of birth missing (living people)
Living people
Pakistani women activists
21st-century women educators
Pakistani businesspeople